Peter R. Vail (born January 13, 1930) is an American geologist and geophysicist, the namesake of the Vail curve of sea level changes.  Vail earned his AB at Dartmouth College in 1952, followed by M.S. and Ph.D. degrees from Northwestern University in 1956. He is currently the W. Maurice Ewing Professor, Emeritus, in the Department of Earth Science at Rice University.

Vail is well known for being the first to realize that seismic reflections do not follow lithofacies boundaries but instead follow geologic time lines. This concept gave rise to the field of seismic stratigraphy.

In 2005 he earned the Benjamin Franklin Medal for his pioneering works in sequence stratigraphy. His other honors include the Legendary Geoscientist Award from the American Geological Institute, the Penrose Medal from the Geological Society of America in 2003, the Sidney Powers Memorial Award, and the Distinguished Educator Award from the American Association of Petroleum Geologists.

External links
 Sequence Stratigraphy and Career Video, Houston Geological Society, January 2006
 Interviews Videos, Mini Geology, 2015

References

American geologists
1930 births
Living people
Penrose Medal winners